200, 202, 204, 206 and 208 Decatur Street are adjoining rowhouses in Cumberland, Allegany County, Maryland. The houses were built in the 1840s or early 1850s. The houses are of a type that, while common elsewhere in Maryland, were not extensively built in Cumberland, in which individual and semi-detached houses were more common. The houses exhibit plain but consistent detailing of a neoclassical nature.

References

External links
, including undated photo, at Maryland Historical Trust

Houses on the National Register of Historic Places in Maryland
Houses in Allegany County, Maryland
Buildings and structures in Cumberland, Maryland
National Register of Historic Places in Allegany County, Maryland